Koo Chung is a Korean American Christian singer-songwriter. Beginning his career with the band Broken for Good in Boston, MA, Chung moved to New York City to start and run his own studio and label, Broken for Good Records.

Discography

Albums

Singles and EPs

External links
Koo Chung's official web site
Koo Chung' MySpace page

Living people
American male singer-songwriters
American male pop singers
American performers of Christian music
Year of birth missing (living people)